Samuel Galbraith JP OBE (4 July 1853 – 10 April 1936) was a Liberal Party politician and Trade Unionist in the United Kingdom.

Background
Galbraith was born in Ballydrain, Comber, Ulster, a son of Samuel Galbraith. He was self educated. In 1886, he married Helen King Petty. In 1917 he was awarded the Order of the British Empire.

Career
Galbraith started work as a checkweighman at Browney colliery. He worked as a Miners’ Agent from 1900 to 1915. He became a Secretary of the Durham Miners' Association.

Politics
Galbraith was an elected member of Durham County Council from 1888 to 1900 and an appointed Alderman from 1900 to 1936.
He was elected unopposed as Member of Parliament (MP) for Mid Durham at a by-election in 1915, sponsored by the Durham Miners' Association. When that constituency was abolished for the 1918 general election, he was selected for the new Spennymoor seat and again sponsored by the Durham Miners. The Coalition Liberal Chief Whip, Freddie Guest regarded him as a supporter of the Coalition government. However, the Coalition government did not endorse him or his Labour opponent, but he was still easily re-elected;

After the election he sat on the Liberal benches in opposition to the Coalition government. He did not contest any further elections, and retired from Parliament at the 1922 general election, aged 69.

He served as a Justice of the Peace for the County of Durham.

References

External links 
 

1853 births
1936 deaths
Liberal Party (UK) MPs for English constituencies
Liberal-Labour (UK) MPs
UK MPs 1910–1918
UK MPs 1918–1922